Jar-Kyshtak (also Жар-Кышлак Jar-Kyshlak) is a village in Aravan District, Osh Region of Kyrgyzstan. Its population was 938 in 2021.

References

Populated places in Osh Region